"Secretly" is a popular song. It was written by Al Hoffman, Dick Manning, Mark Markwell, and Hugo Peretti and Luigi Creatore and published in 1958.
The best-known recording of the song was done by Jimmie Rodgers, which was a gold record.

Chart performance
The Jimmie Rodgers recording charted in 1958, reaching number 3 on the US Billboard Hot 100 and number 5 on the US Billboard C&W Best Sellers in Stores chart.  It was also a hit on the R&B Best Sellers in Stores chart, where it went to number 7.

Cover versions
The song was revived in 1965 when The Lettermen released it as a single. This version became a minor hit on the Billboard Hot 100, reaching number 64, and number 8 on the Easy Listening chart.

References

External links
 

1958 songs
1958 singles
1965 singles
Songs written by Al Hoffman
Songs written by Dick Manning
Songs written by Hugo Peretti
Songs written by Luigi Creatore
Jimmie Rodgers (pop singer) songs
The Lettermen songs
Roulette Records singles
Capitol Records singles